Joe Martin Turns 'Em Loose is a two-reel black-and-white silent comedy film released by Universal Pictures on September 15, 1915. It is not found in the Library of Congress' film preservation database and as such, is believed to be a lost film. The film was regarded by contemporary reviewers as a remarkable for its integration of plot, animal performance and stuntwork. The film’s animals were the trained tigers of Paul Bourgeois (aka Paul Sablon) paired with the menagerie of the recently established Universal City Zoo, under the leadership of  Rex De Rosselli. Bourgeois was the director and scenarist.

Production
The film, distributed by Universal, is credited, variously, to one of two production companies under the Universal umbrella: Rex Motion Picture Company or Victor Studios. Some sources say it was a one-reel film but with a reported running time of 30 minutes that is likely an error.

During production in August 1915, Motion Picture News reported, "A near riot was caused on the rear stage and in the zoo of Universal City the early part of this week when practically all of the animals were turned loose for the filming of the one-reel animal comedy, Joe Martin Turns 'em Loose. The name part is taken by the chimpanzee…" The animal cast included the "least domesticated members" of the Universal City Zoo, including Charlie the Elephant and Princess the Tiger.

Ad copy published in The Moving Picture World reads, in part, "It isn't often that Universal 'turns loose' to the extent of a page to boost a two-reeler—you can judge from this spread that we think mighty well of Joe Martin."

Influence
The title-character ape was an orangutan who had been known as Charlie Chimpanzee but whose stage name was changed Joe Martin, seemingly as a result the success of this picture. Joe Martin went on to a long movie career, appearing in films until 1923. "Joe Martin" became a cultural shorthand and common name for other performing simians of the era.

Carl Laemmle was seemingly proud of his involvement in Joe Martin, such that the studio magazine reported in 1933: "Joe Martin was a monkey and he scored heavily with audiences — so heavily, in fact, that Mr. Laemme recently decided to inject a new 1933 version of the same idea in Nagana." In the case of Nagana starring Melvyn Douglas, the animals collectively save a human life.

Joe Martin, ničema was played at the 1920 inauguration of ", the center of the Czech Social Democratic Party."

Reception
In a 2001 article about the scandalous and somewhat criminal Hollywood era of Paul Bourgeois' career, the film was characterized as "riotous."

A positive review by Peter Milne was published in Motion Picture News at the time of release: "This is an animal picture, but not an animal drama. It is a comedy and one of the most startling forms of humorous amusement that we have ever laid eyes upon…A pet orangoutang bearing the dignified name of Joe Martin perpetrates the deed that is responsible for the confusion and laughter that lies in the two reels. Joe just for diversion opens the gate of every animal cage in the circus and consequently the wild beasts wreck an entire town. An elephant shoves the police station in the river, tigers enter a millinery establishment and completely devastate its contents as well as petrifying the occupants, several bears wreck a delicatessen store, an entire boarding house is thrown into pandemonium by the unheralded entrance of all varieties of animals. All this and a lot more that is both thrilling and funny…Joe Martin Turns Them Loose is really one of the most novel pictures that have ever held the screen. It will please the public because of the wonderful daring of the humans who appear and its many humorous incidents, each one of which is as novel as the picture itself."

Synopsis 

JOE MARTIN TURNS THEM LOOSE (Two parts — Sept. 15). — An old maid receives a telegram from the administrator of a distant uncle's will, stating that he is shipping her share of the inheritance in a box. When the box arrives, the old maid discovers it contains a full-sized orangoutang, which escapes from the box and causes her no end of trouble when she tries to inveigle him to re-enter his prison. In the apartment next to that of the old maid is a musician who persists in torturing a trombone, to the exasperation of the old maid, who vainly tries to persuade him to cease his efforts. He, however, only slams the door in her face. When she returns to her apartment, she finds that the monk has again made his escape from the box and is roaming around the room, doing what damage he can. It is then that her attention is again called to the musician, who resumes his practice upon the trombone. The orang makes his escape from the apartment via a window and makes his way unmolested down the street, until he arrives at a circus tent, in which a performance is at that time going on. He enters the menagerie tent and proceeds to release all the animals of the menagerie. The elephants and camels are stampeded; and the lions, tigers, leopards, pumas, and other animals, proceed to make for freedom. Many exciting scenes follow, in which the animals terrorize the neighborhood. They are finally all captured by the keepers from the circus. The old maid and the musician make up their differences; and, going after the truant monkey, find him engaged in eating fruit at a fruit stand. He is vengefully borne homeward and confined with no chance of escape, while the romance of the old maid and the musician ripens into love.

See also
 An Elephant on His Hands (1913)

References

External links
 
 Joe Martin Turns Them Loose at ECHO

1915 films
1915 short films
1915 comedy films
1915 lost films
Universal Pictures films